The Roman Catholic Diocese of Barcelona is a diocese located in the city of Barcelona in the Ecclesiastical province of Cumaná in Venezuela.

On Thursday, 11 July 2014, the Vatican web site's online daily news bulletin, in the listing of resignations and appointments, stated that Pope Francis had appointed Bishop Jorge Anibal Quintero Chacón, who had been serving as the Bishop of the Roman Catholic Diocese of Margarita, as the Bishop-designate of the Roman Catholic Diocese of Barcelona.

History
On 7 June 1954 Pope Pius XII established the Diocese of Barcelona from the Diocese of Ciudad Bolívar.

On 31 May 2018 from this Diocese was split off the Roman Catholic Diocese of El Tigre by Pope Francis.

Bishops

Ordinaries
José Humberto Paparoni † (4 Oct 1954 - 1 Oct 1959)
Angel Pérez Cisneros † (23 May 1960 - 18 Jun 1969) Appointed, Coadjutor Archbishop of Mérida
Constantino Maradei Donato † (18 Nov 1969 - 16 Nov 1991)
Miguel Delgado Avila, S.D.B. † (16 Nov 1991 - 21 Jun 1997)
César Ramón Ortega Herrera (15 Jul 1998 – 20 Jan 2014)
Jorge Anibal Quintero Chacón (11 Jul 2014 - )

Auxiliary bishop
José Manuel Romero Barrios (2012-2018), appointed Bishop of El Tigre

See also
Roman Catholicism in Venezuela

References

External links
 GCatholic.org
 Catholic Hierarchy 

Roman Catholic dioceses in Venezuela
Roman Catholic Ecclesiastical Province of Cumaná
Christian organizations established in 1954
Roman Catholic dioceses and prelatures established in the 20th century
1954 establishments in Venezuela